Suea Sung Fah II: Payak Payong (lit: The Tiger Commands the Heaven II: Tiger’s Swagger; English title:  Legend of Tiger II - The Invincible) is Thai TV series or lakorn aired on Thailand's Channel 7 from January 30 to April 11, 2013 on Wednesdays and Thursdays at 20:30 for 22 episodes. It sequel of Suea Sung Fah in 2011.

Synopsis
In 1982, Bangkok celebrates the 200th anniversary, The famous gangsters during the reign of King Rama V has resurrected. Sua Han must comeback to be young again, to fight with them.

Cast

References

External links
 

2013 Thai television series debuts
2013 Thai television series endings
Thai action television series
Fantasy television series
Television series set in the 1980s
Channel 7 (Thailand) original programming